Zsolt Tamási (born 25 June 1990) is a Hungarian football midfielder who plays for Budapesti VSC.

Career

Club career
Tamási was sold to Ascoli Calcio 1898 for €1.7 million (in co-ownership deal) and Matteo Di Gennaro was joined Parma in exchange, also for €1.7 million in co-ownership deal. Tamási signed a 5-year contract.

In July 2013 Tamási was signed by Gubbio in temporary deal. He played his first match for the club in a friendly on 31 July. In January he comes back to Ascoli.

References

External links
 
 
 

1990 births
Living people
People from Kalocsa
Hungarian footballers
Hungarian expatriate footballers
Association football midfielders
Atletico Roma F.C. players
Udinese Calcio players
U.S. Triestina Calcio 1918 players
Parma Calcio 1913 players
S.S. Virtus Lanciano 1924 players
Ascoli Calcio 1898 F.C. players
S.S. Racing Club Fondi players
A.S. Gubbio 1910 players
Paksi FC players
Mezőkövesdi SE footballers
Nyíregyháza Spartacus FC players
Soroksár SC players
III. Kerületi TUE footballers
Budapesti VSC footballers
Serie C players
Nemzeti Bajnokság I players
Nemzeti Bajnokság II players
Expatriate footballers in Italy
Hungarian expatriate sportspeople in Italy
Sportspeople from Bács-Kiskun County